Her First Elopement is a 1920 American drama film directed by Sam Wood and written by Edith M. Kennedy. It is based on the 1915 novel Her First Elopement by Alice Duer Miller. The film stars Wanda Hawley, Jerome Patrick, Nell Craig, Lucien Littlefield, Jay Eaton, and Helen Dunbar. The film was released in December 1920, by Realart Pictures Corporation.

Cast         
Wanda Hawley as Christina Elliott
Jerome Patrick as Adrian Maitland
Nell Craig as Lotta St. Regis
Lucien Littlefield as Ted Maitland
Jay Eaton as Gerald Elliott
Helen Dunbar as Letitia Varden
Herbert Standing as John Varden
Edwin Stevens as Mr. Maitland Sr.
Margaret Morris as Bettie Carlisle
Ann Hastings as Trixie
John McKinnon as Captain Hardy

Preservation status
A print of Her First Elopement exists in the Museum of Modern Art collection in New York.

References

External links

 

1920 films
1920s English-language films
Silent American drama films
1920 drama films
Films directed by Sam Wood
American silent feature films
American black-and-white films
Films based on works by Alice Duer Miller
1920s American films